Aaron London is a British singer, songwriter, producer and rapper.

Early life
Aaron London first started singing and producing beats at the age of 13 after learning to play the piano and electric guitar during his childhood.  His production credits include Channel AKA's No. 1 Urban hit 'Think' by Intact.

Career 
Aaron London is a London-based music producer who began over 6 years ago by experimenting with Grime & Hip Hop. The now 21-year-old quickly began gaining attention online following his first release, entitled in the Cut, which features saxophone musician Masego.

Aaron's online success has led to many opportunities, such as playing across Europe, most notably alongside Krept & Konan.

UK grime artist Wiley championed Aaron London's Dream track on his Twitter account.

Radio
London's first BBC radio appearance was on Mic Check with Kan D Man & Limelight on BBC Asian Network show on 27 January 2007 when he played the track ‘Round (feat. Amanda Mellid)’.

Aaron London later appeared on DJ Kayper's show also on the BBC Asian Network in 2012.

References

External links
Official website
BBC – Music – Aaron London
Brit-Asian.Com Introduce Aaron London
Desi-Box Introduce Aaron London

Living people
English male rappers
Year of birth missing (living people)